The Jauru River (Portuguese, Rio Jauru) is a river in Mato Grosso, a state in western Brazil. It is a tributary of the Paraguay River.

See also
List of rivers of Mato Grosso

References

Brazilian Ministry of Transport

Rivers of Mato Grosso